Verdicchio is the name or synonym of several wine and grape varieties including:

Verdicchio, from the Marche region
Verdicchio Bastardo bianco, another name for Pecorino 
Verdicchio Femmina, another name for Verdeca
Verdicchio Giallo, another name for Verdea
Verdicchio Marina, another name for Maceratino
Verdicchio nera, another name for Greco nero